Cat on a Hot Fiddle is a 1960 studio album by Stuff Smith. This album featured the recording debut of Shirley Horn.

Track listing 
 "Undecided" (Sid Robins, Charlie Shavers) – 2:41
 "The Man I Love" (George Gershwin, Ira Gershwin) – 3:45
 "Oh, Lady Be Good!" (G. Gershwin, I. Gershwin) – 2:21
 "Nice Work if You Can Get It" (G. Gershwin, I. Gershwin) – 4:06
 "Take the "A" Train" (Billy Strayhorn) – 4:13
 "Blue Violin" (Andy Razaf, Stuff Smith) – 3:06
 "They Can't Take That Away from Me" (G. Gershwin, I. Gershwin) – 5:09
 "Somebody Loves Me" (Buddy DeSylva, G. Gershwin, Ballard MacDonald) – 3:42
 "'S Wonderful" (G. Gershwin, I. Gershwin) – 3:45
 "Nice and Warm" (Smith) – 3:17
 "Strike Up the Band" (G. Gershwin, I. Gershwin) – 2:52

Personnel 
 Stuff Smith - violin, vocals
 Shirley Horn - piano
 Paul "Scooby" Smith
 Red Mitchell - double bass
 Sid Bulkin - drums
 Harry Saunders

References 

1960 albums
Stuff Smith albums
Verve Records albums
Albums produced by Norman Granz